This is an episode listing for the anime adaptation of Lucky Star. The anime, containing twenty-four episodes, aired between April 8, 2007, and September 16, 2007, on Chiba TV and is produced by the animation company Kyoto Animation. The series was directed by Japanese animation director Yutaka Yamamoto for the first four episodes, but he was fired and replaced by Yasuhiro Takemoto from episode five on. An original video animation episode was produced following the series and was released on September 26, 2008. An anime adaptation of Miyakawa-ke no Kūfuku, produced by Ordet and Encourage Films, began streaming on Ustream on April 29, 2013.

Lucky Star does not have one consistent ending theme, a new theme is used in each episode; most of them are of theme songs from other anime and from tokusatsu television shows. Each ending theme in episodes one through twelve is performed as a karaoke by one of the principal characters. From episode thirteen onwards, each ending theme is performed by Minoru Shiraishi, singing and acting in live action (the exception to this being episode sixteen, which shows a music video excerpt of "Misoji Misaki" by Hiromi Konno).

Lucky Star (2007)

Lucky Star OVA (2008)

Miyakawa-ke no Kūfuku (2013)

Notes

Lucky Star
Episodes

ja:らき☆すた (アニメ)#各話リスト